Tala is a town in Chukha District in southwestern Bhutan, known for the Tala Hydroelectricity Project.

References

External links 
Satellite map at Maplandia.com

Populated places in Bhutan